That Can't Shake Our Willi! is a 1970 German comedy film directed by Rolf Olsen and starring Heinz Erhardt, Ruth Stephan, and Günther Jerschke. It is a sequel to the film What Is the Matter with Willi?. When Sieglinde Hirsekorn and her neighbour Mizzi Buntje meet in the shop Mizzi brags about her planned holiday in Italy as she does not expect her neighbours to be able to afford travelling there. But, provoked by this, Sieglinde Hirsekorn claims that she and her family had decided to travel to Italy long before the neighbours did. Now she has to get her husband to agree on the holiday. Of course they travel to the same place as the neighbours do and the competitiveness of the families doesn't stop on vacation. It was followed in 1971 by a third film Our Willi Is the Best, made with Erhard returning as Willi. The final film Willi Manages The Whole Thing was released in 1972.

The film's sets were designed by the art director Ernst H. Albrecht.

Cast

References

External links

1970 films
West German films
1970 comedy films
German comedy films
1970s German-language films
Films directed by Rolf Olsen
Films about vacationing
Constantin Film films
1970s German films